Michael, Mike, or Mick Fitzpatrick may refer to:

Michael Fitzpatrick (Australian politician) (1816–1881), Australian politician
Michael Fitzpatrick (Kildare politician) (1942–2011), Irish politician
Michael Fitzpatrick (musician) (born 1970), French American musician
Michael Fitzpatrick (physician) (born 1950), British doctor and author
Michael Fitzpatrick (cellist) (born 1964), American cellist and composer
Michael J. Fitzpatrick (politician) (born 1957), American politician
Michael J. Fitzpatrick (diplomat), American diplomat
Michael R. Fitzpatrick, American judge
Mick Fitzpatrick (1893–1968), Irish leader of the IRA and politician
Mike Fitzpatrick (1963–2020), American lawyer and politician
Mike Fitzpatrick (broadcaster) (born 1973), Australian radio broadcaster
Mike Fitzpatrick (footballer) (born 1953), Australian rules footballer, administrator and businessman

See also 
 Fitzpatrick (surname)
 Fitzpatrick (disambiguation)